Timothy Ignatius Lythe (born 19 April 1980 in Auckland) is a New Zealand cricketer who played for the Auckland Aces in the State Championship.  It has been announced that he is moving to the Central Districts Stags for the 2007-08 season where he will play for the Hawke's Bay in the Hawke Cup.

A right-handed batsman and off spinner, he was diagnosed with bone cancer in 1999 at the age of 19 and underwent an operation in which half his left thigh bone was replaced with a titanium rod while his knee was replaced with a complex prosthesis. 

In 9 first class matches for Auckland in 2005/06 and 2006/07 he scored 352 runs at an average of 27 with a best of 66 among his three fifties.  He also took 8 first class wickets.

See also
 List of Auckland representative cricketers

References

External links
Tim Lythe's profile on Cricinfo
 

1980 births
Living people
New Zealand cricketers
Auckland cricketers
Central Districts cricketers